Beatrice St. Clere Priestley (born 22 March 1996) is an English-New Zealand professional wrestler, best known by the ring name Bea Priestley. She is currently signed to WWE, where she performs on the NXT brand under the ring name Blair Davenport. From 2017 until 2021, she wrestled for World Wonder Ring Stardom  and she also made appearances in New Japan Pro-Wrestling serving as Will Ospreay’s valet.

She is also known for her appearances in All Elite Wrestling, World of Sport Wrestling, Defiant Wrestling, and Progress Wrestling.

Professional wrestling career

Early career 
Priestley began training at New Zealand Wide Pro Wrestling's developmental facility under Travis Banks, and debuted for the company as Amy St. Clere when she was 16 years old. After four years, during which time she also wrestled for Impact Pro Wrestling as Beatrice Priestley and the Hughes Academy as Tammy Leigh, Priestley moved to London, England, to further her career, training in Progress Wrestling's developmental program 'The Projo.'

Progress Wrestling (2016–2019) 
Priestley made her debut for Progress Wrestling on 13 March 2016, being defeated by Elizabeth. In December 2016, Priestley participated in the tournament to crown the first ever Progress Women's Champion where Priestley lost to the eventual winner Toni Storm. Throughout the year of 2017 and 2018, Priestley would mainly compete in six-man tag team matches and even feuding with Millie McKenzie.

What Culture Pro Wrestling / Defiant Wrestling (20162019) 
Priestley debuted for What Culture Pro Wrestling (WCPW) on 27 July at Loaded #5, losing to Nixon Newell, but she defeated Newell the following day. On 24 August Priestley and Newell faced off once again, this time in a Last Woman Standing match to crown the first ever WCPW Women's Champion, won by Newell. Priestley unsuccessfully challenged Newell once again at Loaded #19, this time by disqualification. After the match, Priestley's Pacitti Club stablemates The Swords of Essex put Newell out of action and Priestley stole her title, declaring herself "the true Women's Champion". Priestley lost her stolen WCPW Women's Championship to the returning Newell at WCPW True Destiny in February, who had replaced Tessa Blanchard in the match. One day later Priestley regained the WCPW Women's Championship, defeating Nixon Newell in a No Disqualification match.

On 16 June 2017 Priestley was unable to compete, and her replacement Viper lost the title by pinfall to Kay Lee Ray. After that, Priestley would feud with Viper until the last episode of Loaded, where Priestley defeated Viper to end the feud. On 17 June 2018 Priestley defeated Millie McKenzie to regain the Defiant Women's Championship. On 3 December 2018 Priestley lost the title to Kanji in a Gauntlet match involving Kay Lee Ray, Lana Austin, Little Miss Roxxy, and Millie McKenzie.

World Wonder Ring Stardom (2017–2021) 
On 14 October 2017 Priestley made her debut for the World Wonder Ring Stardom promotion by entering the Goddesses of Stardom Tag League tournament. Days before the final of the tournament Priestley unsuccessfully challenged Toni Storm for the SWA World and World of Stardom Championship in Stardom event in Taiwan. She ended up winning the tournament along with Kelly Klein. Following the tournament, Priestley and Klein unsuccessfully challenged Oedo Tai (Hana Kimura and Kagetsu) for the Goddess of Stardom Championship. In her six month stay in Stardom, Priestley made it to the finals of the 2018 Cinderella Tournament, before losing to the eventual winner Momo Watanabe.

On 4 May 2019, at Golden Week Stars 2019 Queen's Quest Produce, Priestley defeated Kagetsu for the World of Stardom Championship.

In January 2020, Priestley paired with Oedo Tai member Jamie Hayter to capture the Goddess of Stardom Championship, the first foreign tag team to hold the championships. She would later join the villainous Oedo Tai faction after betraying Queen's Quest stable-mate Momo Watanabe. On 20 July 2020, Stardom stripped the tag titles from Priestley and Hayter, as the duo could not defend the titles in Japan due to the COVID-19 pandemic. Priestley made her return to the company on 19 September, where she attacked Saya Iida in her match against Natsuko Tora, and later attacked Momo Watanabe and Utami Hayashishita. On 3 October at Yokohama Cinderella, Priestley defeated Watanabe to win the vacant SWA World Championship.

World of Sport (2018–2019) 
At 5 May 2018 tapings of the newly-revived World of Sport Wrestling, Priestley failed to win the vacant WOS Women's Championship in a three-way match against Kay Lee Ray and Viper. She unsuccessfully challenged Ray for the title on subsequent episodes in a battle royal and a singles match against Ray after being attacked by Viper. On 19 January 2019, on a WOS house show tour, Priestley won the title in a singles match when she successfully pinned Viper. On 2 February 2019 Priestley lost the title to Viper after that she left the promotion.

All Elite Wrestling (2019–2020) 
On 22 January 2019 it was reported that Priestley was close to signing a contract with All Elite Wrestling (AEW) after turning down a WWE contract. It was announced on the edition of 27 February 2019 of "Road To Double Or Nothing" that Priestley would be joining the company, and would be making her debut at Fight for the Fallen on 13 July 2019, where she would team with Shoko Nakajima to defeat Britt Baker and Riho. She entered an on-screen feud with Britt Baker after legitimately concussing Baker after kicking her in the back of the head- which was her first offensive move barely 3 seconds into her participation in the match. Ending their feud, where Baker openly referred to Priestley as "un-professional", Priestley eventually lost the conclusive singles match of this feud to Baker at Full Gear. Priestley appeared on 11 December 2019 edition of Dark, where she was defeated by "the Alien" Kris Statlander.

On 11 March 2020 episode of Dynamite, Priestley returned and teamed with AEW Women’s Champion Nyla Rose to defeat the team of Hikaru Shida and Kris Statlander. After the match she attacked Nyla Rose and called her shot at the AEW Women’s Championship. Priestley was released from AEW on 13 August 2020 due to being unable to travel from her home in Japan due to restrictions from COVID-19.

New Japan Pro-Wrestling (2020–2021) 
On 16 October 2020, Priestley made her debut appearance in New Japan Pro-Wrestling, where she interfered in her boyfriend Will Ospreay's match against Kazuchika Okada in the G1 Climax.

WWE (2021–present) 
On 24 June 2021, it was reported that Priestley signed a contract with WWE, where a vignette aired promoting Priestley's arrival to NXT UK with her new ring name revealed to be Blair Davenport. Davenport would score a winning streak over several opponents such as Xia Brookside, Nina Samuels, Emilia McKenzie and many more until she seized an opportunity to challenge Meiko Satomura for the NXT UK Women's Championship. On 6 January 2022, episode of NXT UK, Davenport failed to capture the title from Satomura, marking her first loss in NXT UK. On 23 August 2022, episode of NXT 2.0, Davenport made her in-ring debut in the brand and collected her first win over Indi Hartwell, and was then confronted by the NXT Women’s Champion Mandy Rose and the NXT UK Women’s Champion Meiko Satomura, which set up a triple threat match to unify both the NXT UK Women's Championship and the NXT Women's Championship at the Worlds Collide pay-per-view on 4 September, where Davenport lost when she was pinned by Rose.

Personal life 
Priestley was diagnosed with a brain tumor when she was 14 years old. She underwent surgery to remove it at 18 years old. 

Since 2017, Priestley had been in a relationship with fellow professional wrestler Will Ospreay. In 2019, the couple revealed they were planning on moving to Japan due to both of their wrestling schedules there.  The couple split in late 2021.

Championships and accomplishments 
 What Culture Pro Wrestling / Defiant Wrestling
 WCPW/Defiant Women's Championship (2 times)
 Fight Forever Wrestling
 Fight Forever Women's World Championship (1 time)
 Pro Wrestling Illustrated
 Ranked No. 20 of the top 100 female singles wrestlers in the PWI Women's 100 in 2019
 Ranked No. 29 of the top 50 tag teams in the PWI Tag Team 50 in 2020 
 World of Sport Wrestling
 WOS Women's Championship (1 time)
 World Wonder Ring Stardom
 Artist of Stardom Championship (1 time) – with Natsuko Tora and Saki Kashima
 Goddess of Stardom Championship (2 times) – with Jamie Hayter (1) and Konami (1)
 Goddesses of Stardom Tag League (2017) – with Kelly Klein
 SWA World Championship (1 time)
 Trios Tag Team Tournament (2019) – with Utami Hayashishita and Viper
 World of Stardom Championship (1 time)
 Stardom Year-End Award (1 time)
 Special Merit Award	(2020)

References

External links 

 
 
 

1996 births
English expatriate sportspeople in Japan
English female professional wrestlers
English people of New Zealand descent
Expatriate professional wrestlers in Japan
Living people
New Zealand expatriate sportspeople in England
New Zealand female professional wrestlers
Professional wrestling managers and valets
Sportspeople from Harrogate
21st-century professional wrestlers
World of Stardom Champions
Goddess of Stardom Champions
Artist of Stardom Champions
SWA World Champions